Adam Sidlow (born 25 October 1987) is an English professional rugby league footballer who plays as a  for the Salford Red Devils in the Betfred Super League.

He previously played for the Widnes Vikings in two separate spells in National League One, Workington Town in 2007 National League Two and the Salford City Reds in 2008 National League One and the Super League. Sidlow also played for the Bradford Bulls in the Super League and the Championship, and the Toronto Wolfpack in all three tiers of professional rugby league in Europe.

Early career
In his junior and youth career, he represented Lancashire Academy and was in the train-on squad for the England Academy.

Salford City Reds
Sidlow played for Salford between 2008 and 2012.

Bradford Bulls
2013 - 2013 Season

Sidlow featured in the pre-season friendlies against Dewsbury Rams and Leeds Rhinos.

He featured in fourteen consecutive games from Round 1 (Wakefield Trinity Wildcats) to Round 14 (Leeds Rhinos). He was injured for Rounds 15-16 but he returned in Round 17 (Hull Kingston Rovers) to Round 21 (Wigan Warriors). Adam was injured for the rest of the season. Sidlow featured in the Challenge Cup against Rochdale Hornets and London Broncos. He scored against Wakefield Trinity Wildcats (1 try), Castleford Tigers (1 try), Leeds Rhinos (1 try), Widnes Vikings (1 try) and Wigan Warriors (1 try).

2014 - 2014 Season

Sidlow featured in the pre-season friendlies against Hull FC, Dewsbury Rams and Castleford Tigers.

He featured in Round 1 (Castleford Tigers) to Round 4 (Hull F.C.). Sidlow also appeared in Round 6 (Hull Kingston Rovers) and then Round 8 (Salford Red Devils) to Round 9 (Leeds Rhinos). Adam played in Round 11 (Warrington Wolves) to Round 26 (Widnes Vikings). Sidlow also featured in Round 5 (Catalans Dragons) in the Challenge Cup. He scored against London Broncos (1 try), Salford Red Devils (1 try) and Hull F.C. (1 try).

Sidlow re-signed with the Bulls for another year even though they had been relegated to the Championship.

2015 - 2015 Season

Sidlow featured in the pre-season friendlies against Castleford Tigers and Leeds Rhinos.

He featured in Round 1 (Leigh Centurions) to Round 5 (Batley Bulldogs) then in Round 7 (Halifax) to Round 22 (Leigh Centurions). Sidlow played in Qualifier 1 (Sheffield Eagles) to Qualifier 6 (Leigh Centurions). Adam played in the £1 Million Game against Wakefield Trinity Wildcats. He also featured in the Challenge Cup in Round 4 (Workington Town) to Round 5 (Hull Kingston Rovers). He scored against Whitehaven (1 try), Workington Town (2 tries), Sheffield Eagles (1 try), London Broncos (1 try) and Doncaster (1 try).

2016 - 2016 Season

Sidlow featured in the pre-season friendly against Leeds Rhinos.

He featured in Round 1 (Featherstone Rovers) to Round 5 (Oldham) then in Round 12 (London Broncos) to Round 23 (Featherstone Rovers). Sidlow played in the Championship Shield Game 1 (Whitehaven) to the Final (Sheffield Eagles). He scored against Swinton Lions (1 try), Sheffield Eagles (2 tries, 1 goal), Workington Town (1 try) and Whitehaven (1 try).

Toronto Wolfpack
Following the Bulls' liquidation at the start of the 2017 season, Sidlow joined League 1 side Toronto Wolfpack.

Leigh
On 20 November 2020 it was announced that Sidlow would join the Leigh Centurions for the 2021 season.
In round 18 of the 2021 Super League season, he scored two tries for Leigh in a 28-34 loss against Hull KR.
On 28 May 2022, Sidlow played for Leigh in their 2022 RFL 1895 Cup final victory over Featherstone.
On 3 October 2022, Sidlow played for Leigh in their Million Pound Game victory over Batley which saw the club promoted back to the Super League.

Statistics

References

External links
Toronto Wolfpack profile

1987 births
Living people
Bradford Bulls players
English rugby league players
Leigh Leopards captains
Leigh Leopards players
Rugby league props
Rugby league second-rows
Salford Red Devils players
Toronto Wolfpack players
Widnes Vikings players
Workington Town players